The 1961 AFC Youth Championship was held in Bangkok, Thailand. Burma and Indonesia drew in the final and shared the title.

Teams
The following teams entered the tournament:

 
 
 
 
 
 
 
 
  (host)

Group stage

Group A

Group B

Third place match

Final

External links
Results by RSSSF

AFC U-19 Championship
1961 in Thai sport
1961 in Asian football
International association football competitions hosted by Thailand
1961 in youth association football
April 1961 sports events in Thailand